The 1967–68 Oakland Oaks season was the first and season of the franchise in the American Basketball Association (ABA). The Oaks played in the first ever game of the ABA on October 13, 1967, beating the Anaheim Amigos 134–129. Rick Barry attempted to defect over to the Oaks, due to being angered by San Francisco Warriors management's failure to pay him certain incentive awards he felt he was due. However the team sued to stop him from playing, which meant that he would sit out the season rather than play for the Warriors, subsequently doing radio broadcasts for the Oaks. The next season, Barry was allowed to play for the Oaks.  The team struggled, finishing dead last in the West by 3 games, with the worst record in the ABA. The Oaks averaged 110.8 points a game (which was 4th best in the league), but gave up an average of 117.4 points, the worst in the league. According to the Elo rating system, the Oaks had the second-worst performance of any professional basketball team ever in a major league, of 1485 such team-seasons, with only the 1946–47 Pittsburgh Ironmen having a worse year.

Roster
 14 Andrew Anderson – Point guard
 44 Wesley Bialosuknia – Shooting guard
 30 Gary Bradds – Power forward
 55 Mike Dabich – Center
 11 Ron Franz – Small forward
 42/55 Jim Hadnot – Center
 33 Ira Harge – Center
 31 Steve Jones – Shooting guard
 32 David Lee – Small forward
 12 Barry Leibowitz – Point guard
 32 Wayne Molis – Center
 40 Mel Peterson – Small forward
 33 Willie Porter – Power forward
 15 Al Salvadori – Forward
 34 Levern Tart – Shooting guard
 30 Gene Wiley – Center

Final standings

Western Division

Record vs. opponents

Awards and honors
1968 ABA All-Star Game selections (game played on January 9, 1968)
 Levern Tart

References

External links
 https://web.archive.org/web/20070927223307/http://www.remembertheaba.com/Oakland-Oaks.html Oakland Oaks

Oakland Oaks
Oakland Oaks, 1967-68
Oakland Oaks, 1967-68
Basketball in Oakland, California
20th century in Oakland, California